Arivonimamo is a district of Itasy in Madagascar.

Communes
The district is further divided into 22 communes:

 Alkamisikely
 Ambatomanga
 Ambatomirahavavy
 Amboanana
 Ambohimandry
 Ambohimasina
 Ambohipandrano
 Ambohitrambo
 Ampahimanga
 Andranomiely
 Antambolo
 Antenimbe
 Arivonimamo
 Arivonimamo II
 Imeritsitosika
 Mahatsinjo Est
 Manalalondo
 Marofangady
 Miantsoarivo
 Morafeno
 Morarano
 Talata Tsimadilo

References 

Districts of Itasy Region